Belle Island may refer to:

Belle Island (Andaman and Nicobar Islands)
Belle Island (Wisconsin)

See also
 Bell Island (disambiguation)
 Belle Isle (disambiguation)
 Belleisle (disambiguation)